{{Automatic taxobox
| image =
| image_caption =
| taxon = Roseburia
| authority = Duncan et al. 2006
| type_species = Roseburia cecicola
| subdivision_ranks = Species
| subdivision = Roseburia cecicolaRoseburia faecis
Roseburia hominisRoseburia intestinalis
Roseburia inulinivorans
}}Roseburia'' is a genus of butyrate-producing, Gram-positive anaerobic bacteria that inhabit the human colon. Named in honor of Theodor Rosebury, they are members of the phylum Bacillota (formerly known as Firmicutes).

Increased abundance of Roseburia is associated with weight loss and reduced glucose intolerance in mice.

References

Lachnospiraceae
Gram-positive bacteria
Gut flora bacteria
Bacteria genera